Tőzsér ([ˈtøːʒeːr]) is a Hungarian surname. Notable people with the surname include:

Dániel Tőzsér (born 1985), Hungarian football midfielder
Ilona Tőzsér, Hungarian sprint canoer

See also
Tozer (surname)

Hungarian-language surnames